Herzog is a German title of nobility.

Herzog may also refer to:

 Herzog (surname), including a list of persons with the surname
, the name of more than one United States Navy ship
 Herzog (novel), a novel by Saul Bellow
 Herzog (video game), a strategy video game by TechnoSoft
 Herzog (band), an American indie rock band
 Herzog Mountains, Papua New Guinea
 Herzog Hospital, a psycho-geriatric hospital in Israel
 Herzog, a township in Ellis County, Kansas
 Herzog, a Volga-German settlement renamed Victoria, Kansas, in 1913

See also